Jean-François Cailhava de L'Estandoux or d'Estendoux (28 April 1731 – 26 June 1813) was a French dramatist, poet and critic.

L'Estandoux was born in Estandoux, Toulouse.  He was elected the ninth occupant of Académie française seat 29 in 1803.  He died, aged 82, in Paris.

Works 
Theatre
 Le Tuteur dupé, comédie en 5 actes et en prose, sujet tiré de Plautus, acte deuxième du Soldat fanfaron, Paris, Comédiens français ordinaires du roi, 30 September 1765
 Les Étrennes de l'amour, comédie-ballet en un acte, Paris, Comédiens italiens ordinaires du roi, 1 January 1769
 La Fille supposée, comédie en 3 actes et en vers, Paris, Comédiens français, 10 April 1769
 Le Mariage interrompu, comédie en 3 actes et en vers, Paris, Comédiens français, 20 April 1769
 Le Jeune Présomptueux, ou le Nouveau Débarqué, Paris, Comédiens français, 2 August 1769
 Le Nouveau Marié, ou les Importuns, opéra comique in 1 act, Paris, Comédiens italiens ordinaires du Roi, 20 September 1770
 Arlequin Mahomet ou le cabriolet vivant, drame philosophi-comi-tragique-extravagant en trois actes et en prose, Paris, Comédiens italiens du roi, 1770
 La buona Figliuola, opéra-comique en 3 actes, parodiée en français sur la musique du célèbre Piccini, Paris, Comédiens italiens du roi, 17 June 1771
 L'Égoïsme, comédie en 5 actes, Paris, Comédiens français, 19 June 1777
 Les Journalistes anglois, comedy in 3 acts and in prose (1782)
 Athènes pacifiée, comedy in 3 acts and in prose, from the eleven onze pieces  by Aristophanes (1796)
 L'Enlèvement de Ragotin et de Mme Bouvillon ou le Roman comique dénoué, comedy in two acts (1798)
 Les Ménechmes, grecs, comedy in 4 acts, preceded by a prologue, Paris, Théâtre-Français, 1791
 Le Dépit amoureux, rétabli en 5 actes, hommage à Molière (1801)
 Théâtre complet (5 volumes, 1802)
Studies on theatre
 De l'Art de la comédie, ou Détail raisonné des diverses parties de la comédie et de ses différents genres, suivi d'un traité de l'imitation, où l'on compare à leurs originaux les imitations de Molière et celles des modernes, terminé par l'exposition des causes de la décadence du théâtre et des moyens de le faire refleurir (4 volumes, 1771). Réédition : Slatkine, Genève, 1970.
 Études sur Molière, ou Observations sur la vie, les mœurs, les ouvrages de cet auteur, et sur la manière de jouer ses pièces, pour faire suite aux diverses éditions des Œuvres de Molière (1802)
 Réflexions présentées au Comité d'Instruction publique, en réponse aux Mémoires de quelques Directeur des Spectacles de Province, contre les droits des Auteurs dramatiques (S. l. n. d., 4 p.) Texte en ligne : .
Tales
 Le Soupé des petits maitres, ouvrage moral (1770). Réédité sous le titre Les contes en vers et en prose de feu l'abbé de Colibri, ou Le soupé, conte composé de mille et un contes (1797)

External links

1703 births
1788 deaths
People from Haute-Garonne
18th-century French writers
18th-century French male writers
19th-century French writers
French literary critics
17th-century French dramatists and playwrights
18th-century French dramatists and playwrights
17th-century French poets
17th-century French male writers
Members of the Académie Française